Talnik is a rural locality (a village) in Semyonkinsky Selsoviet, Aurgazinsky District, Bashkortostan, Russia. The population was 33 as of 2010. There is 1 street.

Geography 
Talnik is located 34 km southwest of Tolbazy (the district's administrative centre) by road. Verkhny Begenyash is the nearest rural locality.

References 

Rural localities in Aurgazinsky District